Pine River Breaks Provincial Park is a provincial park in British Columbia, Canada in the Peace River Lowland between the communities of East Pine and Chetwynd.

See also
East Pine Provincial Park

References
BC Parks webpage

External links

Peace River Regional District
Provincial parks of British Columbia
Peace River Country
Canyons and gorges of British Columbia
2000 establishments in British Columbia
Protected areas established in 2000